Abruzzi is a region of central Italy.

Abruzzi may also refer to:

Places
Abruzzi Glacier in northern Pakistan
Abruzzi Ridge, Mount Saint Elias, Canada
Abruzzi Spur, K2, Pakistan
Abruzzi e Molise, the formerly combined region of Abruzzo and Molise

Other uses
Duke of Abruzzi's Free-tailed Bat
Luigi Amedeo, Duke of the Abruzzi (1873–1933), member of the Italian royal family and noted explorer
John Abruzzi, a fictional character from the 2005 series Prison Break
Panoz Abruzzi, a 2011 American sports car

See also
Abbruzzi, an alternate spelling of the surname